Lake Cut Bank was a glacial lake formed during the late Pleistocene along the Missouri and Sun Rivers.  After the Laurentide Ice Sheet retreated, water melting off the glacier accumulated between the Rocky Mountinas and the ice sheet. The lake drained along the front of the ice sheet, eastward  towards the Judith River and the Missouri River.

The front of the Keewatin ice sheet completely blocked the valley of Cut Bank Creek so that for  the ice dam was bordered by the water of an extensive lake, which has been designated glacial Lake Cut Bank. It is defined by the granitic pebbles and boulders on top of the hills southeast of Cut Bank and are present at several places in the basin farther north and west all below . The pebbles were deposited from icebergs floating on the lake. The lake bottom is identified by the laminated silts over the flatter parts of the basin. Additionally, stratified sand and gravel are visible in the basin. There is no defined shoreline. The Carlow Flat shows evidence of being submerged part of the time. This is taken as the maximum and first lake level. The lake drained southward along the ice front.

The inner gorge of Cut Bank Creek formed after the glacial lake drained. Cut Bank Glacier and the South Fork of the Milk River drained into Lake Cut Bank.
Water from the St. Mary Glacier and from both the mountain glaciers and the Keewatin ice sheet, north of the international boundary drained into the South Fork of the Milk River and then into glacial Lake Cut Bank.  The glacial river channel is not abandoned. It runs form the Milk River northeast of Landslide Butte to the head of Rocky Coulee.
By assuming that each layer of the laminated clay deposited in this lake is a varve, representing one season's deposition, the longevity of the lake could be counted.

References

See also
List of prehistoric lakes
Proglacial lakes of the Missouri River Basin
Lake Cut Bank
Lake Chouteau
Lake Great Falls
Lake Musselshell
Lake Jordan.
Lake Circle
Lake Glendive
Lake McKenzie

Cut Bank
Cut
Cut Bank